Cheilosia  vulpina  is a Palearctic hoverfly.

Description
Very similar to Cheilosia variabilis For identification see references.

Distribution and biology
. 
The habitat  is open coniferous and deciduous woodland, and grassland, pasture the altitude of Picea forest. Flowers visited include white Umbelliferae, Heracleum, Chaerophyllum, Bellis, Galium, Ranunculus Flies April to September. The larva feeds on the roots of Cynara scolymus.

References

External links
 Images representing Cheilosia vulpina

Diptera of Europe
Eristalinae
Insects described in 1822
Taxa named by Johann Wilhelm Meigen